Robert Arthur William Coogan (born 11 July 1929) was  Archdeacon of Hampstead from 1985 to 1984.

A Tasmanian, Coogan was educated at his home state university and later completed a diploma in Theology at Durham University. He was Curate of  St Andrew, Plaistow then Rector of Bothwell. He then held further incumbencies in North Woolwich, Hampstead, Gospel Oak and Old St Pancras. He was also Area Dean of South Camden (1975–1981) and  North Camden (1978–1983); a Prebendary of St Paul's Cathedral (1982-1985;  and Examing Chaplain to the Bishop of Edmonton from 1985 to 1994.

Notes

1929 births
Living people
Archdeacons of Hampstead
University of Tasmania alumni
People from Tasmania
Alumni of Durham University